The list includes all individuals who were first in line to the throne of Italy, either as heir apparent or as heir presumptive, since 1861. Those who actually succeeded to the throne are shown in bold.

Heirs to the throne

Italian monarchy
Italy
Italy